The Jacksonville Skyway is an automated people mover in Jacksonville, Florida. It opened in 1989 and is operated by the Jacksonville Transportation Authority (JTA). The skyway has three stations in Downtown Jacksonville and was extended in 1996 following a conversion from its original technology to Bombardier Transportation equipment. It was expanded again in 1998 and 2000. The currently fare-free system comprises two routes across  of track, serving eight stations, and crosses the St. Johns River on the Acosta Bridge.

, the Skyway typically only operates on weekdays, although JTA does operate the system on weekends with special events downtown.

Description 

The Skyway runs on an elevated two-way monorail track. The  system serves eight stations in Downtown Jacksonville: five in the Downtown Core and LaVilla areas, and three across the St. Johns River on the Southbank. There are two routes running south from Rosa Parks Transit Station and branching at Central station: one going west and terminating at LaVilla station, and the other going south over the river and terminating at Kings Avenue station on the Southbank.

From 1989 to 1996 the system used VAL 256-type rubber-wheeled vehicles designed by Matra. In 1997, this was replaced by the current system designed by Bombardier Transportation, a version of its UM III monorail technology.

The Skyway connects to the JTA's bus rapid transit system, known as the First Coast Flyer, at the Jacksonville Regional Transportation Center at LaVilla.

History

Planning and development 
An automated people mover for Downtown Jacksonville was first proposed in 1972 to deal with traffic and parking issues in the urban core. In 1976, the city incorporated the system into its mobility plan, hoping to attract interest from the Urban Mass Transit Administration's Downtown Peoplemover Program. The initial study was undertaken by the Florida Department of Transportation and Jacksonville's planning department, who took the Skyway project to the Jacksonville Transportation Authority (JTA) in 1977 for further development.

After several stops and starts, UMTA selected Jacksonville as one of seven cities to receive federal funding for the "Automated Skyway Express" in 1985. Two other related projects are Miami's Metromover and Detroit's People Mover. UMTA's approved plan called for the construction of a  Phase I system to be built in three segments; the agency awarded JTA $23.5 million for the initial  Phase I-A segment.

Implementation and expansion 
In July 1987, JTA selected French company Matra to build the Phase I-A segment. Work was completed in May 1989 at a cost of $34.6 million and revenue service started June 5. At its opening the Skyway served three stations on its east–west route: Central, Jefferson, and Terminal Station and Convention Center (now LaVilla station) on the Northbank of Downtown Jacksonville. Subsequent extensions were planned to take the Skyway north to Florida Community College at Jacksonville (FCCJ), and then south across the St. Johns River over the Acosta Bridge. Development of these routes began in 1992 and 1995, respectively, but negotiations for a new contract with Matra failed when the previous one expired. In October 1994 Bombardier Transportation was awarded a new contract to revamp the existing east–west segment with new technology and to complete the remaining Phase I extensions.

The system was shut down on December 15, 1996, to replace the former Matra technology with Bombardier equipment; the older cars were sold to O'Hare International Airport in Chicago. The northbound extension was completed, adding the Hemming Plaza and Rosa Parks Transit Station stops, and the Skyway reopened on December 15, 1997, with service from the Prime F. Osborn III Convention Center to FSCJ. The southern segment opened on October 30, 1998, adding service to San Marco Station on Jacksonville's Southbank. On November 1, 2000, the Riverplace and Kings Avenue Stations opened, completing the Southbank segment and Phase I of the Skyway.

Use 
Ridership on the Skyway has been far below initial projections; while JTA originally anticipated 100,000 riders monthly, it averaged less than a third of that by 2009. The primary reasons are the decline of the downtown workforce and lack of connections to other neighborhoods and modes of transit. The system became a major point of contention in Jacksonville, with critics considering it a "ride to nowhere" and a waste of resources. In 2010, after underperforming for over twenty years, The Florida Times-Union called it "a Jacksonville joke for a generation". However, others argued that expansion of the system and downtown revitalization could make it a success.

In February 2012, the Skyway was temporarily made free to ride until a new payment system was installed. Ridership jumped 61%—to 481,000 annually. Ridership in 2013 averaged nearly 4,000 on weekdays (the system is closed on weekends except for special events) and JTA renewed the fare-free policy through the end of 2016. , it continues to be free to ride. In light of this momentum, JTA Director Nat Ford has announced the agency will apply for grants to expand the system with a new station in the fast-growing Brooklyn neighborhood.

The Skyway now and future plans 
In December 2015 the Jacksonville Transit Authority announced plans to review the installation and operation citing problems that "Skyway’s current vehicles are so old the parts can no longer be replaced — four of 10 vehicles are out of commission — and JTA staff said industry experts did not respond favorably to the possibility of overhauling them".  The review considered options to refurbish the current rolling stock, buy replacement vehicles, expand the system, tear down the structure or convert it to alternative use such as a walking path. JTA said in January 2017 that they are "trying to keep the Skyway operating for another five years as it determines the future of the system"

As part of the construction of the agency's Jacksonville Regional Transportation Center (JRTC), the Convention Center station closed for a period of time to allow for the dismantling of original station elements (such as the overhead station canopy) and construct the new facility partially over the existing tracks. The existing platform was kept but with modifications made in order to tie everything into the new facility. While the new JRTC opened on May 4, 2020, the Skyway did not commence service to the facility until July of that year due to a temporary pause in Skyway service caused by COVID-19.

On March 3, 2021, JTA announced that it had approved plans to convert a portion of its Skyway maintenance facility property off Leila St in the Brooklyn neighborhood to the planned Brooklyn station, with construction to begin in September 2021 and completion projected for some time in early 2022.

Ultimate Urban Circulator (U2C) 

In December 2016 preference was given for replacement of the monorail by shared autonomous vehicles  that would see vehicles run on the elevated route currently used by the monorail but also continue on an extended network at street level.  The system would have some similarity to personal rapid transit or group rapid transit except at ground level it will either run in mixed traffic or its lanes will have grade crossings with other traffic.

In December 2017, JTA launched the U2C AV Test and Learn track which serves as an outdoor classroom to test and evaluate multiple vehicles and their associated technologies from the AV shuttle industry.  As of 2020 vehicles from three different suppliers have been trialed.  In 2019 the JTA indicated an interim phase would involve the modification of one of the monorail beams to allow use by autonomous vehicles while the Skyway continues to run on the other side.

JTA revealed more detailed plans in 2020 that the U2C network will have 10 route miles – elevated track and ground level roadways – also covering surrounding suburbs such as San Marco, Springfield, and Brooklyn/Riverside (with the future possibility of connecting it with the proposed First Coast Commuter Rail network).

In May 2021 the Jacksonville City Council voted to remove $132 million from the budget for the U2C, leaving $240 million for the project.

Stations 

The Jacksonville Skyway has eight stations on two lines: the Northbank (LaVilla) line, and the Southbank (Kings Avenue) line. All trains run through Rosa Parks Transit Station, Hemming Park station, and Central, where they split.

See also 
List of rapid transit systems
List of United States railroads
List of Florida railroads
Transportation in Jacksonville, Florida
Jacksonville Transportation Authority

References

External links 

 Official site

 
Florida railroads
Monorails in the United States
Rapid transit in Florida
Transportation in Jacksonville, Florida
UM people movers
Railway lines opened in 1989
People mover systems in the United States
Urban people mover systems
Downtown Jacksonville
1989 establishments in Florida
Transportation buildings and structures in Duval County, Florida